The Chatham Wheels were a minor professional ice hockey team that played in Colonial Hockey League (CoHL) from 1992 to 1994. Based in Chatham, Ontario, Canada, the team played it homes games in the Chatham Memorial Arena. 

In its first season, 1992–93, the expansion team was coached by Ron Caron, and in its second and last season in Chatham, 1993–94, it was coach by Tom Barrett. The team made it to the Colonial Cup championship in 1994 where it lost to the Thunder Bay Senators in five games.

Prior to the start the 1994–95 season, the franchise was relocated to Saginaw, Michigan, as the Saginaw Wheels.

References

External links
Team profile at HockeyDB.com

Defunct ice hockey teams in Canada
Ice hockey clubs established in 1992
Ice hockey clubs disestablished in 1994
1992 establishments in Ontario
1994 disestablishments in Ontario
Chatham-Kent